Rick Houenipwela, more commonly known as Rick Hou, (born 8 August 1958) is a politician, and the immediate past Prime Minister of Solomon Islands from 15 November 2017 to 24 April 2019.

He has a Bachelor's degree in accounting, and served as the governor of the Central Bank of Solomon Islands from 1993 to 2008, before becoming Senior Advisor to the Executive Director of the World Bank, and then going into politics. The Solomon Times described him as "one of the key public figures in the Solomon Islands whose credibility is intact, if not enhanced, after resisting corruption and several attempts by fraudsters to bankrupt the nation during the ethnic conflict" of the early 2000s.

The magazine Islands Business named him "Man of the Year" for the Pacific region in 2003, at a time when he was Governor of the Central Bank. ABC Radio's Sean Dorney described him in 2011 as a critic of excessive exploitation of the country's forests, a modest man who had shown "strength [...] over the years in standing up to those who have exploited the country. He took a courageous stand in defending the Central Bank from extortion in the face of considerable intimidation from those with the guns during the worst of the ethnic tensions".

His career in national politics began when he was elected to Parliament as the member for Small Malaita in the August 2010 general election, standing as a member of the Democratic Party. Party leader Steve Abana became Leader of the Opposition, and appointed Houenipwela Shadow Minister for Finance and the Treasury. In early April 2011, having been ousted from the leadership of the Opposition, Abana defected to Prime Minister Danny Philip's government, bringing with him several members of the Opposition, including Houenipwela. The latter was appointed Minister for Public Service.

In early November 2011, several ministers joined or rejoined the Opposition, ultimately bringing down the government. On November 9, three ministers returned to the Opposition. The following day, Rick Hou joined them. On the day after that, Prime Minister Danny Philip sacked Finance Minister Gordon Darcy Lilo, reportedly for conspiring with the Opposition. Hours later, Philip announced his own resignation, as he clearly no longer had the numbers with which to govern. On November 16, Parliament chose Lilo to replace him. Lilo appointed Hou as his Minister of Finance of the Solomon Islands. Upon his appointment, Houenipwela told the Solomon Star he would seek to exempt "low paid workers" from paying tax, while also "lower[ing] the tax rates to enable companies to be profitable". There would be increased government support and investment in "productive sectors", including agriculture, tourism and fisheries.

In April 2015, he took a stand in Parliament against members of Parliament being exempted from paying income tax. He stated that he would refuse his own tax exemption.

References

1958 births
Living people
Finance Ministers of the Solomon Islands
Prime Ministers of the Solomon Islands
Members of the National Parliament of the Solomon Islands
People from Malaita Province
Solomon Islands bankers